Ovídio de Sousa Martins (September 17, 1928 in Mindelo, São Vicente – April 29, 1999 in Lisbon, Portugal) was a famous Cape Verdean poet and journalist.  He attended high school in his home country, he went to pursue studies in Portugal and did not achieve studies due to health reasons.  He was one of the founders of the Cultural Supplement Bulletin of Cape Verde in 1958.  He lived in exile in the Netherlands due to his pro-independence activities in his native land and produced 100 poems there.

His poem Flagelados do vento leste and Comunhão can be found on the CD Poesia de Cabo Verde e Sete Poemas de Sebastião da Gama by Afonso Dias.

Works

Books
Caminhada (Little Road), Lisbon (1962) – Poemas
100 Poemas - Gritarei, Berrarei, Matarei - Não vou para pasárgada (100 Poems), 1973 (Poems in Portuguese and in the creole of São Vicente)
Tchutchinha, Lisbon (1962)

Poems
Poems in the creole of São Vicente:

Liberdade, Nôs morte, Hora nô ta bá junte, Cantá nha pove, Cretcheu, Um spada na mon, Comparaçon, Consciénça, Um r’bêra pa mar, Dstine, Ma de canal, Pescador, Cantáme.

Poems in Portuguese:

Mindelo, Terra dos meus amores, Caboverdianamente, Minha dor, Seca, Flagelados do vento-leste, Comunhão.

Notes

Bibliography
Richard Lobban and Paul Khalil Saucier, "Ovidio Martins" in Historical Dictionary of the Republic of Cape Verde, Lanham, Md; Toronto; Plymouth, UK, Scarecrow Press, 2007, p. 146

External links
 Victorian.fortunecity.com 
Secrel.com.br
 [https://web.archive.org/web/20060422074314/http://www.asemana.cv/article.php3?id_article=10994 A Poesia de Ovídio Martins (Poems by Ovídio Martins)]
"Ovídio Martins, o poeta-profeta, faria 83 anos a 17 de Setembro" Expresso das Ilhas'', September 16, 2011

1928 births
1999 deaths
20th-century poets
Cape Verdean poets
Cape Verdean journalists
Writers in Cape Verdean Creole
People from Mindelo
20th-century journalists